The Robinvale railway line is a freight only country railway line in north-western Victoria, Australia. The line branches from the Mildura line at Dunolly, and at Inglewood the Eaglehawk – Inglewood line connects with the Piangil line outside Bendigo. The parallel Kulwin line junctions from the Robinvale line at Korong Vale then continues northward.

History
The line was opened from Inglewood to Korong Vale in 1882, and first extended towards Charlton as part of what is now the Kulwin line. The line from Korong Vale to Boort opened in 1883, and to Quambatook in 1894. It was extended to Ultima in 1900, to Chillingollah in 1909, to Manangatang in 1914, to Annuello in 1921, and Robinvale in 1924. In 1930, it was extended to Koorakee, New South Wales, as part of the proposed Lette railway line, although that section was never officially opened for traffic. The extension into New South Wales involved the construction of a lift-span bridge over the Murray River. The section in New South Wales closed in 1943.

Access to Melbourne was originally from the Bendigo line via Bridgewater, until the opening of the Dunolly to Inglewood route to the Mildura line in 1888.

The last regular passenger service on the line, operated by a DERM, ran from Bendigo to Robinvale on 3 June 1978. From 5 June 1978, the service was replaced by Bendigo – Ultima and Swan Hill – Robinvale buses.

Operation
Today the line operates using the Train Order Working system of safeworking, with just a single crossing loop at Korong Vale.

In 2008 the line was booked out for upgrades to the track and level crossings from Ultima to Robinvale. In April 2008, it was announced that the Korong Vale – Quambatook section of the line would be upgraded as part of the Victorian core grain network, in a $23.7 million package with six other lines. The Dunolly – Korong Vale section had already been upgraded.

In 2008, the line was cut back to Manangatang, and containers formerly loaded at Boort are now loaded at Donald (Mildura line). The Eaglehawk (Bendigo) - Inglewood link has had traffic suspended, and has been disconnected at the northern end. All trains run via Dunolly on the Mildura line. The line speed was cut to 25 km/h from Korong Vale to Lalbert, due to poor sleeper condition, then 40km/h beyond. While the Mildura line was being converted to standard gauge, the containers normally loaded at Merbein were loaded at Manangatang.

The line was scheduled to be converted to standard gauge after the conversion of the Mildura and Murrayville lines had been completed. That work was cancelled in 2019, due to the Murray Basin Rail Project, under which the conversion was to be done, running out of money.

Current operations are grain services as required, which are operated by Pacific National and Southern Shorthaul Railroad, as well as a container train service from Ultima to Victoria Dock, which is operated by QUBE Logistics.

References

Further reading

External links
Vicsig.net - Robinvale line

Freight railway lines in Victoria (Australia)
Railway lines opened in 1882
5 ft 3 in gauge railways in Australia